Jaya may refer to:

Media 
Jaya, self titled albums by Jaya (singer), released in 1989, 1996 and 2001
Jaya (film), a 2002 Indian Tamil film

Mythology 
Jaya, a name of Karna in Mahabharata; the core portion of the Mahabharata
Jaya-Vijaya, the door-keepers of Vaikuntha, the realm of the god Vishnu in Hindu mythology
Jaya, Sanskrit masculine word meaning victorious, epithet of Brahma. The feminine version is Jayaa, epithet of Saraswati.

People
Jaya (given name), list of people with this name, or names derived from it

Places

Fictional places 
Jaya, an island in Oda Eiichiro's manga and anime series One Piece

Indonesia 
Bintaro Jaya, a real-estate in the outskirts of Jakarta
Jakarta, comes from the name: Jayakarta which means "victorious city".
Jayapura
Puncak Jaya, the country's highest mountain

Malaysia 
Petaling Jaya
Putrajaya
Seberang Jaya

Science
Aspidoparia jaya, a fish native to India and Bangladesh
Jaya (insect), a genus of antlions

See also
Greater Jakarta Metropolitan Regional Police (Polda Metro Jaya), the police force of Jakarta
Irian Jaya
Jaya Group, Indonesian company founded by Ciputra
Jaya TV, a Tamil language satellite television channel
Satyameva Jayate